Miguel Ángel Rodríguez (born 1940) is a Costa Rican economist, lawyer, businessman and politician.

Miguel Ángel Rodríguez may also refer to:

 Miguel Ángel Rodríguez (singer), Spanish actor and singer known as El Sevilla
 Miguel Ángel Rodríguez (racewalker) (born 1967), Mexican race walker
 Miguel Ángel Rodríguez (squash player) (born 1985), Colombian squash player
 Miguel Ángel Rodríguez (Mexican actor), Mexican actor, director and producer known for his role in Rosalinda